Ypthima impura, the impure ringlet (known in Afrikaans as the vuil-ringetjie), is a butterfly of the family Nymphalidae. It is found in most of Sub-Saharan Africa.

The wingspan is 32–36 mm for males and 34–38 mm for females. Adults are on wing year round with peak in early summer and autumn in southern Africa. The butterfly usually has three ocelli on the underside of their hindwing, although these may not appear during the dry season.

The larvae feed on Poaceae grasses. Larvae have also been reared on Ehrharta erecta. Females are usually more sedentary than males, with stouter abdomens.

Subspecies
The species may be divided into the following subspecies:
 Ypthima impura impura (Ivory Coast to Nigeria, Cameroon, Zaire, Angola)
 Ypthima impura paupera Ungemach, 1932 -Bushveld ringlet (Ethiopia, from eastern Africa to Transvaal and KwaZulu-Natal)

References

impura
Butterflies of Africa
Butterflies described in 1893